Graham County USD 281 is a public unified school district headquartered in Hill City, Kansas, United States.  The district includes the communities of Hill City, Bogue, Morland, Nicodemus, Penokee, St. Peter, and nearby rural areas.

Schools
The school district operates the following schools:
 Hill City Junior-Senior High School
 Hill City Elementary School
 Graham County Learning Center

History
Previously known as Hill City USD 281, it absorbed Morland USD 280 in 2002.

It previously operated Longfellow Middle School.

Athletics
The Hill City High School mascot is Ringnecks.

The Hill City Ringnecks have won the following Kansas State High School championships:
 1969 Boys Track & Field - Class 2A 
 1970 Boys Basketball - Class 2A  
 1970 Boys Track & Field - Class 2A 
 1971 Boys Track & Field - Class 2A 
 1976 Girls Basketball - Class 2A 
 1976 Girls Track & Field - Class 2A 
 1978 Boys Basketball - Class 2A 
 1978 Boys Track & Field - Class 2A 
 1979 Boys Track & Field - Class 2A 
 1997 Boys Track & Field - Class 2A 
 1998 Boys Basketball - Class 2A

See also
 Kansas State Department of Education
 Kansas State High School Activities Association
 List of high schools in Kansas
 List of unified school districts in Kansas

References

External links
 

School districts in Kansas
Graham County, Kansas